Dude, Where's the Party? aka Where's the party yaar? is a 2003 film directed by Benny Mathews. It stars Kal Penn and Sunil Malhotra. It is a comedic film that  focuses mainly on the Indian American experience.

Plot
Harishkumar Satishkumar Patel (Sunil Malhotra) is a geeky student from a small village in Gujarat, India who is attending the University of Houston, while living with his uncle (his father's best friend). His uncle, Dr. Bakshi, has an American-born son who is Hari's age, Mohan Bakshi (Kal Penn). Mohan, known as Mo, is a very popular Indian student at UH. He shows Hari around the college but then stays away from him because of Hari's nerdy ways.

Hari, meanwhile, is overly excited because of an astrological prediction that was made by a holy man. The famous astrologer told Hari that he'll meet his Sapno Ki Raani (the girl of his dreams) in America and her name will begin with alphabet "P". Hari then meets Priya (Tina Cherian), a Malayali studying fashion, and falls in love with her. In the meanwhile, Mo falls in love with Janvi Valia (Serena Varghese), a Punjabi girl, but things don't go as planned when Mo invites Janvi to a party. In the film's conclusion, Mo learns important things about his culture, and Hari overcomes his challenges. This film is primarily a comedic portrayal of young Indian Americans going through life.

Cast 
Mohan Bakshi: Kal Penn
Harishkumar Satishkumar Patel: Sunil Malhotra
Ray (Ramesh Kumar): Prem Shah
Supriya Varghese: Tina Cherian
Janvi Valia: Serena Varghese
Shyam Sunder Balabhadrapatramukhi: Sunil Thakkar
Poonam Mehta: Mousami Dave
Jiten Kothari: Jiten Kothari

Reception

The movie got positive reviews from critics.

References

External links
 
 

2003 films
Films about Indian Americans
Films set in Houston
Films shot in Houston
Films by Desi directors
2000s English-language films